O'Rahilly is an Irish surname, concentrated in Munster, chiefly in Cork, Kerry and Limerick.

People with surname O'Rahilly include:

 Alfred O'Rahilly (1884–1969), noted academic, President of University College Cork and Teachta Dála
 Aogán Ó Rathaille or Egan O'Rahilly (1670-1727), Irish language poet
 Cecile O'Rahilly (1894-1980), Irish scholar of the Celtic languages
 Helen O'Rahilly, Irish television executive, and the first female director of television production at RTÉ
 Michael Joseph O'Rahilly (1875-1916), self-described as The O'Rahilly, Irish republican who took part in the Easter Rising
 Ronan O'Rahilly (b. 1940), Irish businessman best known for the creation of the offshore radio station, Radio Caroline
 Stephen O'Rahilly (fl. 2006), medical researcher, collaborator with I. Sadaf Farooqi on etiology of heart disease 
 T. F. O'Rahilly, (1883–1953), Irish scholar of the Celtic languages

O'Rahilly may also refer to:

 Collegeland O'Rahilly's GAA, a Gaelic Athletic Association club on the Armagh-Tyrone border just outside Charlemont and the Moy
 Kerins O'Rahilly's GAA, a Gaelic Athletics Association club based in Tralee, County Kerry

References

Surnames of Irish origin